The cricoarytenoid joint is a joint connecting the cricoid cartilage and the arytenoid cartilage. It is a very shallow ball-and-socket joint. It allows for rotation and gliding motion. This controls the abduction and adduction of the vocal cords.

Structure 
The cricoarytenoid joint is a very shallow ball-and-socket joint.

Function 
The cricoarytenoid joint allows for rotation and gliding motion. The extent of rotation is significant, while the extent of gliding is limited.

The cricoarytenoid joint controls the abduction and adduction of the vocal cords. It is moved by many of the intrinsic muscles of the larynx.

History 
The cricoarytenoid joint was first described by Galen.

See also 
 Cricoarytenoid muscle

References

External links
 

Human head and neck
Joints
Joints of the head and neck